Culver Creek (also known as Culver's Creek) is a tributary of Shickshinny Creek in Luzerne County, Pennsylvania, in the United States. It is designated as a Coldwater Fishery and a Migratory Fishery. The surficial geology along the creek and in its vicinity consists of Wisconsinan Till, Wisconsinan Bouldery Till, alluvial fan, and bedrock consisting of sandstone and shale.

Course
Culver Creek begins in Osborn Culver Pond in Ross Township. It flows southeast for several hundred feet before turning south-southeast for several tenths of a mile and entering Union Township. After several tenths of a mile, the creek turns south and then southeast and reaches its confluence with Shickshinny Creek in Shickshinny Lake.

Geography and geology

The surficial geology along most of Culver Creek features a glacial or resedimented till known as Wisconsinan Till. There is also a patch of Wisconsinan Bouldery Till near the creek's headwaters and a patch of alluvial fan at its mouth. The surficial geology in the vicinity of the creek also features bedrock consisting of sandstone and shale in a number of places.

Watershed
The creek is entirely within the United States Geological Survey quadrangle of Shickshinny. It is near the village of Muhlenburg. The creek's headwaters are in a pond, which is known as Osborn Culver Pond and its mouth is in a lake, which is known as Shickshinny Lake.

History
Culver Creek was entered into the Geographic Names Information System on August 2, 1979. Its identifier in the Geographic Names Information System is 1172822.

In 1892, plans were made to construct a stone arch bridge across Culver Creek in Ross Township. This bridge was to cost $250.

Biology
The entire drainage basin of Culver Creek is designated as a Coldwater Fishery and a Migratory Fishery.

See also
Reyburn Creek, next tributary of Shickshinny Creek going downstream
List of rivers of Pennsylvania

References

Rivers of Luzerne County, Pennsylvania
Tributaries of the Susquehanna River
Rivers of Pennsylvania